jMonkeyEngine (abbreviated JME) is a game engine for developing 3D games written in Java. It uses shader technology extensively and can be used to write games for Windows, Linux, macOS, Raspberry Pi, Android, and iOS (currently in alpha testing). It uses Lightweight Java Game Library as its default renderer and another renderer based on Java OpenGL is available and supports OpenGL 2 to OpenGL 4.

jMonkeyEngine is a community-centric open-source software project released under the New BSD license. It is used by several commercial game studios and educational institutions. The default jMonkeyEngine 3 download comes integrated with an advanced software development kit (SDK).

jMonkeyEngine 3 SDK
By itself, jMonkeyEngine is a collection of computing libraries, making it a low-level game development tool. Coupled with an integrated development environment like the official jMonkeyEngine 3 SDK, it becomes a higher level game development environment with multiple graphical components. 

The SDK is based on the NetBeans Platform, enabling graphical editors and plugin capabilities. Alongside the default NetBeans update centers, the SDK has its own plugin repository and a selection between stable point releases or nightly updates. 

Since March 5th, 2016, the SDK is no longer officially supported by the core team. It is still being actively maintained by the community. The term "jMonkeyPlatform" is also used interchangeably with "jMonkeyEngine 3 SDK".

History
jMonkeyEngine helps to improve the lack of full featured graphics engines written in Java. The project has evolved over time.

jMonkeyEngine 0.1 – 2.0
Version 0.1 to 2.0 of jMonkeyEngine marks the time from when the project was first established in 2003, until the last 2.0 version was released in 2008. When the original core developers gradually discontinued work on the project throughout the end of 2007 and the beginning of 2008, Version 2.0 had not yet been made officially stable. The code-base became adopted for commercial use and was most popular with the engine's community at the time.

jMonkeyEngine 3.0
Since the departure of jME's core developers in late 2008, the codebase remained practically stagnant for several months. The community continued to commit patches, but the project was not moving in any clear direction. Development on Version 3.0 started as an experiment. 

The first preview release of jME3 in early 2009 drew positive attention from many members in the community, and the majority agreed that this new branch would be the official successor to jME 2.0. From there on, all the formalities were sorted out between the previous core developers and the new.

Projects powered by jMonkeyEngine

Nord, a browser-based massively multiplayer online game (MMO) on Facebook, created by Skygoblin
Grappling Hook, a first-person action and puzzle game, created by an independent developer
Drohtin, a real-time strategy game (RTS)
Chaos, a 3D fantasy cooperative role-playing game (RPG) by 4Realms
Skullstone, a 3D retro-styled single player dungeon crawler game, created by Black Torch Games
Spoxel, a 2D action-adventure sandbox video game, created by Epaga Games
Lightspeed Frontier, a space sandbox game with RPG, building, and exploration elements, created by Crowdwork Studios
Subspace Infinity, a 2D top-down space fighter MMO
3079 and 3089, randomly generated and open-world RPGs by Phr00t's Software

Reception 
 JavaOne 2008 Presentation
 Finalist in PacktPub Open Source Graphics Software Award 2010

Ardor3D fork
Ardor3D began life on September 23, 2008, as a fork from jMonkeyEngine by Joshua Slack and Rikard Herlitz due to what they perceived as irreconcilable issues with naming, provenance, licensing, and community structure in that engine, as well as a desire to back a powerful open-source Java engine with organized corporate support. 

The first public release came January 2, 2009, with new releases following every few months thereafter. In 2011, Ardor3D was used in the Mars Curiosity mission both by NASA Ames and NASA JPL for visualizing terrain and rover movement. 

On March 11, 2014, Joshua Slack announced that the project would be abandoned, although the software itself would remain under zlib license and continue to be freely available. However, a subset of Ardor3D called "JogAmp's Ardor3D Continuation" was still actively maintained by Julien Gouesse as of 2014.

References

External links
 

2003 software
3D scenegraph APIs
Free 3D graphics software
Free game engines
Free software programmed in Java (programming language)
Java (programming language) libraries
Video game engines
Software using the BSD license